The electoral district of Caulfield is an electoral district of the Victorian Legislative Assembly. The electorate is surrounded by the other electoral districts of Prahran, Albert Park, Malvern, Oakleigh, Bentleigh and Brighton.

It covers the metropolitan suburbs of Caulfield, Caulfield North, Caulfield South, Caulfield East, Elsternwick, Gardenvale, Ripponlea and Balaclava and parts of St Kilda East, St Kilda, Glen Huntly and Ormond within South-East Melbourne. Approximately 45,222 people reside in the electorate which has been contested at each state election in Victoria since 1927.

The longest serving member is Ted Tanner, who held the seat for a period of 17 years, between 1979 and 1996.

The seat lies in the inner south-east metropolitan Melbourne and was once safe for the Liberal Party. However, a changing demographic and on-going electoral boundary changes have made the electorate increasingly marginal over the past decade. In the 2018 Victorian state election, the seat of Caulfield became the most marginal seat in Victoria with a 205-vote difference between the Labor Party and the Liberal party on a two party preferred basis. Recent redistributions have meant the current margin before the 2022 Victorian State Election is almost 0.001% towards the Liberal Party. 

The seat has been held by the Liberal Party for the majority of the time since its creation in 1927, the party has been held by the Electoral Reform Party and multiple independents. The Labor Party has never held the seat.

David Southwick is the current member of parliament for Caulfield, who is also the Deputy Leader for the Victorian Liberal Party.

Members for Caulfield

Election results

References

External links
 Electorate profile: Caulfield District, Victorian Electoral Commission

Electoral districts of Victoria (Australia)
1927 establishments in Australia
City of Glen Eira
City of Port Phillip
St Kilda East, Victoria
Electoral districts and divisions of Greater Melbourne